Jenae Ambrose (born 29 December 1997) is a Bahamian sprinter. In 2014, she competed in the girls' 100 metres event at the 2014 Summer Youth Olympics held in Nanjing, China. She competed in the women's 4 × 100 metres relay at the 2017 World Championships in Athletics.

References

External links
 

1997 births
Living people
Bahamian female sprinters
World Athletics Championships athletes for the Bahamas
Place of birth missing (living people)
Athletes (track and field) at the 2014 Summer Youth Olympics